Singara  is a genus of moths of the family Erebidae. The genus was erected by Francis Walker in 1865.

Species
Singara diversalis Walker, 1865 north-eastern Himalayas, Myanmar, Thailand, southern China, Sumatra, Borneo
Singara humberti Viette, 1966 Madagascar
Singara mantasoa Viette, 1981 Madagascar
Singara marojejy Viette, 1981 Madagascar
Singara ochreoplagata Bethune-Baker, 1908 New Guinea
Singara ochreostrigata Bethune-Baker, 1908 New Guinea
Singara ovalis Viette, 1981
Singara vaovalis Viette, 1981 Madagascar

References

Walker, Francis (1865). List of the Specimens of Lepidopterous Insects in the Collection of the British Museum. (33): 1113.

Calpinae